Patty vs. Patty is a Canadian short documentary film, directed by Chris Strikes and released in 2022. The film recounts the true story of the "patty wars" of 1985, when restaurants in Toronto which served Jamaican patties had to fight a bureaucratic edict that they could not call their product a "patty", on the grounds that consumers might confuse them with hamburger patties, through a mixture of documentary footage and satirical dramatic reenactments performed by Star Trek: Discovery and Bite of a Mango actor Orville Cummings.

The film premiered February 17, 2022, on CBC Gem and YouTube. It was also later screened at the 2022 Hot Docs Canadian International Documentary Festival, and the 2022 Vancouver International Film Festival.

Awards
The film was nominated for Best Short Film at the 2022 Directors Guild of Canada awards.

The film received a Canadian Screen Award nomination for Best Short Documentary at the 11th Canadian Screen Awards in 2023.

References

External links
 

2022 films
2022 short documentary films
English-language Canadian films
Canadian short documentary films
2020s Canadian films
Films shot in Toronto
Films set in Toronto
Documentary films about Black Canadians